István Sárközi (21 October 1947 – 31 January 1992) was a Hungarian footballer.

He was born in Jászberény. He won a gold medal in the 1968 Olympic team competition. He died in January 1992 at only 44 years of age.

References

External links
 

1947 births
1992 deaths
People from Jászberény
Hungarian footballers
Footballers at the 1968 Summer Olympics
Olympic footballers of Hungary
Olympic gold medalists for Hungary
Olympic medalists in football
Medalists at the 1968 Summer Olympics
Association football forwards
Sportspeople from Jász-Nagykun-Szolnok County
Egri FC players
MTK Budapest FC players